St. Ignatius Catholic School may refer to:

 St Ignatius Catholic School, Toowong, Australia
 St. Ignatius of Loyola Catholic School, Wellington Catholic District School Board, Canada
 St. Ignatius Catholic School (Cayman Islands)
 St. Ignatius Catholic School, Saint Heliers, New Zealand
 St. Ignatius Catholic Primary School, Sunbury on Thames, United Kingdom

See also
 Saint Ignatius College (disambiguation)
 St. Ignatius High School (disambiguation)
 St. Ignatius (disambiguation)